Corbitt was an American automobile, truck, and farm equipment manufacturer.  Founded as a horse-drawn carriage manufacturer in 1899, the company began building automobiles in 1907, and the business expanded over the years to include light and heavy trucks, intracity buses, personnel vehicles for the U.S. Army, and farm tractors. Based in Henderson, North Carolina, for its entire history, it sold in 1952 to the United Industrial Syndicate, a New York City-based company which gradually liquidated Corbitt and shut it down. The last production vehicles came off the line in 1954, though a few vehicles were cobbled together from leftover parts in the years after that.

References 

Defunct motor vehicle manufacturers of the United States
Vehicle manufacturing companies established in 1899
American companies established in 1899
1899 establishments in North Carolina
Defunct truck manufacturers of the United States
Defunct manufacturing companies based in North Carolina